Alois Josef hrabě Krakovský z Kolovrat or Krakowský z Kolowrat (21 January 1759 – 28 March 1833) was the Roman Catholic archbishop of Prague from 1831 to 1833.

Biography
Krakowsky was born in Prague in 1759. He was a nobleman, member of the Kolowrat-Krakowsky family. He was ordained a priest on his twenty-second birthday, 21 January 1781. In 1800, he was appointed the auxiliary bishop of Olomouc in the Czech Republic, as well as titular bishop of Sarepta. It was fifteen years before he was appointed bishop of Hradec Králové. He remained in this capacity until 28 February 1831 when he was appointed archbishop of Prague. Exactly two years and a month later, he died at the age of 74.

References

External links
 Archbishop Alois Jozef Krakowski von Kolowrat profile at Catholic-Hierarchy
 Biographical entry for Kolowrat-Krakowsky in the Allgemeine Deutsche Biographie by Ludwig Schlesinger 

1759 births
1833 deaths
18th-century Bohemian Roman Catholic priests
19th-century Czech people
Roman Catholic archbishops in the Austrian Empire
Bohemian nobility
Roman Catholic archbishops of Prague